Ihor Zahalskyi (born 19 May 1991) is a professional Ukrainian football midfielder who plays for Metalurh Zaporizhya.

Career
Zahalskyi is a product of the different sportive schools in his native Kirovohrad Oblast. He spent time with different Ukrainian teams, and in 2012 he signed a contract with FC Zirka from his native Kropyvnytskyi.

In 2015 Zahalskyi was a member of the Ukrainian student football team at the Summer Universiade in Gwangju, South Korea.

On 28 May 2018 he signed contract with SC Dnipro-1.

References

External links
 
 

Ukrainian footballers
Sportspeople from Kropyvnytskyi
Ukraine student international footballers
Association football midfielders
FC Zirka-2 Kirovohrad players
FC Olimpik Kropyvnytskyi players
FC Zirka Kropyvnytskyi players
SC Dnipro-1 players
FC Inhulets Petrove players
FC Obolon-Brovar Kyiv players
FC Metalurh Zaporizhzhia players
Ukrainian Premier League players
1991 births
Living people